Vasyl Nazarovych Karazin (30 January 1773 – 4 November 1842) was a Ukrainian Enlightenment figure, intellectual, inventor, scientific publisher, founder of the Ministry of National Education in the Russian Empire, and of the Imperial Kharkiv University (now the V. N. Karazin Kharkiv National University in Ukraine).

Biography

Karazin was born in Kruchik village, Kharkov Governorate in the Russian Empire (now Ukraine). His father was Nazar Karazin, a Russian Imperial Army officer noted for his involvement in Pârvu Cantacuzino's 1769 rebellion in Wallachia. Karazin's mother Varvara belonged to Russian nobility and was of partial Cossack starshyna ancestry. Vasyl Karazin considered himself to be ethnic Serbian while his paternal family were originally known as Karadžić, which has Serb Montenegrin origins. He was married to Alexandra Karazina (née Mukhina) from Moscow, who was well known as a translator of French literature into Russian; her stepfather was the Russian Imperial General major Egor von Blankennagel. 

Karazin was educated in schools for the nobility in Kharkiv and then in Kremenchuk. At the age of eighteen, he left for Saint Petersburg, and underwent military training in the 1st Semyonovsky Independent Rifle Regiment. He also studied at the School of Mines, one of the top educational institutions in the Russian Empire at that time. Karazin was unhappy in this environment, and often reacted against the manners and customs condoned by the nobility of the times. Unsatisfied with his military service, he moved back to his village and married a fourteen-year-old serf girl.

In 1798, Karazin attempted to leave Russia given his opposition to the policies of Emperor Paul I, but was denied a passport.  After he attempted to cross the border illegally, he was swiftly arrested.

When Alexander I took power, Karazin began petitioning him with his views on government development, pointing out the state's need to invest in education. In 1802 he obtained the tsar's permission to open a university in Kharkiv. On 1 September of that year, during a meeting of the Kharkiv nobility, he gave a famous speech on the benefits of having a university, asking for voluntary donations. Lacking sufficient funding and academic supplies, Karazin struggled to achieve his educational priorities. The local elite preferred to have a military college in the city.

On 17 January 1805, Kharkiv University was opened but Karazin did not take part in the opening ceremony, as by that time he had lost his position with the Ministry of Education. According to Alexander Herzen, "the colossal ideas of Karazin were downscaled to a provincial German Hochschule". Forced to return to his village, Karazin established a school for local children. In November 1808, he wrote a letter to the emperor titled On non-intervention in European affairs for which he was arrested for a second time.

Karazin carried out a wide range of academic work. He was a member of seven academies and published more than 60 articles in different fields of science, primarily agriculture, pharmacology, chemistry, and physics. As an example of his innovative spirit, in 1810 in his village he opened the first weather station in the territory of present-day Ukraine.

Karazin repeatedly voiced critiques of what he viewed as Alexander's resistance to self-government and national education in the Russian Empire. Karazin was the founding father of the Ministry of National Education. His direct confrontation with Emperor Alexander I was so public, that in 1820–21 Karazin was even imprisoned in Shlisselburg Fortress. After that he lived in his family estate. Karazin died in Nikolaev.

The Russian painter and writer Nikolay Karazin was his grandson.

See also
Kharkiv University (V. N. Karazin Kharkiv National University), University in Kharkiv named in his honour
Andrej Dudrovich
Atanasije Stojković
Teodor Filipović
Gligorije Trlajić
Sava Petrović
Đorđe Koritar

References

External links

 "An Enthusiastic 'Ukrainian Lomonosov'", Zerkalo Nedeli, #1(376), 5 January 2002 Available online in Russian and in Ukrainian.
 Vasyl Karazin. Bibliography
 A.M Peskov Boratynsky

Enlightenment scientists
Politicians of the Russian Empire
Inventors from the Russian Empire
19th-century scientists from the Russian Empire
People from the Russian Empire of Serbian descent
People from the Russian Empire of Greek descent
Ukrainian politicians
Ukrainian inventors
Russian meteorologists
18th-century Serbian people
1773 births
1842 deaths
People from Kharkiv Oblast
Prisoners of Shlisselburg fortress